Aled Euros Miles (born 23 May 1965) is a British-American information technology executive and internet security expert currently based in San Francisco and Los Angeles, California.

He currently serves as president and CEO and board member of Sauce Labs and was appointed in September 2020 as the Welsh Government Envoy to the United States. Previously he served as CEO and member of the board of global tech firm TeleSign Corporation.

He is a graduate of St. Mary's University and the Stanford Graduate School of Business, and previously served on the executive committee as a senior vice president at the global security firm, Symantec.

Career

Miles began his business technology career at the security firm Symantec. He worked in various roles over his twenty year tenure, eventually reaching the position of senior vice president, where he oversaw the global Norton division.

In 2006, Miles relocated to the United States to become president and COO of Los Angeles-based Helinet Aviation Services, a helicopter services provider. During this time, he also became the CEO of Cineflex Camera Systems, which developed gyro-stabilized camera systems used in aerial broadcast production. During his tenure, Cineflex was awarded Emmy recognition for its role in the filming of the BBC's documentary series, "Planet Earth". In 2007 Cineflex was acquired by Nasdaq listed company Axsys Technologies (AXYS). In 2009, Axsys was acquired by General Dynamics and Miles returned to Symantec.

In 2015, leaving Symantec's executive committee, Miles served as executive vice-president and general manager for the identity and access management software company ForgeRock. In 2017, Miles became CEO of TeleSign, a Communications Platform as a Service company mainly involved in Two-factor authentication services, based in Marina Del Rey, California. In 2017, Miles oversaw the $230 million acquisition of TeleSign by the Belgian communications company Belgacom ICS. BICS is a joint venture between Proximus, SwissCom & MTN

In October 2019, Miles was appointed CEO of Sauce Labs, based in San Francisco, California, replacing former CEO, Charles Ramsey.

Boards

Miles serves and has served on several boards in both the business and non-profit sectors. Today he is the executive chairman of Industrial IoT company IoTium and is a non-executive director of the Australian cyber security company Sapien alongside The Hon. Stephen Smith and Lieutenant General (ret.) James Clapper, former Director of National Intelligence under U.S. President Barack Obama. He served on the board of the NCSA from 2017 to 2018.

Due to his work on Planet Earth through Cineflex, he was founding board member of Wildstar.tv led by the award winning producers and directors, Vanessa Berlowitz and Mark Linfield.

He was a founding advisory board member of Surf Air, a California-based unlimited flight commuter airline, and served as a member of the CGI Leadership, Education and Development program administered by the Clinton Global Initiative.

He currently sits on the board of Royal Welsh College of Music and Drama and Whispir.

Miles is a patron of Rainbow Trust Children's Charity, where he has also served on the board of trustees.

References

1965 births
British people of Welsh descent
Businesspeople in information technology
Living people
Welsh businesspeople
Stanford University alumni
Technology corporate directors